Nokere Castle is a castle in Kruishoutem, Belgium.

See also
List of castles in Belgium

Castles in Belgium
Castles in East Flanders